Rimmanapudi is a village in Krishna district of the Indian state of Andhra Pradesh. It is located in Pamarru mandal in Gudivada revenue division.

See also 
Villages in Pamarru mandal

References

Villages in Krishna district
Mandal headquarters in Krishna district